Sead Hadžibulić (born 30 January 1983) is a Serbian football forward.

Club career
After beginning his career by playing in his home town clubs FK Jošanica and FK Novi Pazar with short loan spell with FK Zvižd. In summer 2007 he moved to Romania where he played the 2007–08 season with Liga I side Gloria Bistrița. Next summer he was back in Serbia ready to make a debut in the Serbian SuperLiga with the newly promoted side FK Javor Ivanjica. However fierce competition in the squad made him want to search for a place where he could get more chances, choosing to move abroad again, this time to Albanian Superliga side FK Apolonia Fier where he played until the winter break of the 2009–10 season. Another Albanian top flight side brought him that winter, KF Vllaznia Shkodër having reached to become runners-up of the 2009–10 Albanian Cup that season. Curiously, that summer he will move precisely to the team that had won them at that Cup final, KF Besa Kavajë who had just won the domestic Supercup title as well. However, the next season was not as successful as the previous one for Besa, and Hadžibulić left the team at the following winter break.

After having played for 2 years in Albanian top flight clubs, Hadžibulić returned to Serbia during the winter break of the 2010–11 season signing with his former club FK Javor Ivanjica.  This time he became a regular in the squad and, after only 6 months, his good performances earned him a move to a more ambitious SuperLiga side FK Hajduk Kula.

Tampines Rovers
In June 2012, Hadžibulić joined the Tampines Rovers in Singapore. Over the course of one season, he scored 11 goals in 24 league games.

Jagodina
On June 23, 2013, Hadžibulić signed for FK Jagodina. After matches in Europa League Qualifiers, he left to Radnički Niš.

Honours
Besa Kavajë
Albanian Supercup: 2010
Tampines Rovers
S.League: 2012, 2013
Koper
Slovenian Cup: 2015

References

External links
 
 Sead Hadžibulić Stats at Utakmica.rs 

1983 births
Living people
Sportspeople from Novi Pazar
Bosniaks of Serbia
Serbian footballers
Association football midfielders
FK Novi Pazar players
FK Radnički Niš players
FK Hajduk Kula players
FK Jagodina players
Expatriate footballers in Romania
Liga I players
ACF Gloria Bistrița players
Serbian SuperLiga players
FK Javor Ivanjica players
Expatriate footballers in Albania
KF Apolonia Fier players
Besa Kavajë players
KF Vllaznia Shkodër players
Kategoria Superiore players
Expatriate footballers in Singapore
Tampines Rovers FC players
Singapore Premier League players
FC Koper players
Expatriate footballers in Slovenia
Naxxar Lions F.C. players
Expatriate footballers in Malta
NK Travnik players
FK Iskra Danilovgrad players